Polymer banknotes are banknotes made from a synthetic polymer such as biaxially oriented polypropylene (BOPP). Such notes incorporate many security features not available in paper banknotes, including the use of metameric inks. Polymer banknotes last significantly longer than paper notes, causing a decrease in environmental impact and a reduced cost of production and replacement. Modern polymer banknotes were first developed by the Reserve Bank of Australia (RBA), Commonwealth Scientific and Industrial Research Organisation (CSIRO) and The University of Melbourne. They were first issued as currency in Australia during 1988 (coinciding with Australia's bicentennial year); by 1996, the Australian dollar was switched completely to polymer banknotes. Romania was the first country in Europe to issue a plastic note in 1999 and became the third country after Australia and New Zealand to fully convert to polymer by 2003.

Other currencies that have been switched completely to polymer banknotes include: the Vietnamese đồng (2006) although this is only applied to banknotes with denominations above 5,000 đồng, the Brunei dollar (2006), the Nigerian Naira (2007), the Papua New Guinean kina (2008), the Canadian dollar (2013), the Maldivian rufiyaa (2017), the Mauritanian ouguiya (2017), the Nicaraguan córdoba (2017), the Vanuatu vatu (2017), the Eastern Caribbean dollar (2019), the sterling (2021) and the Barbadian dollar (2022). Several countries and regions have now introduced polymer banknotes into commemorative or general circulation, including: Nigeria, Cape Verde, Chile, The Gambia, Trinidad and Tobago, Vietnam, Mexico, Singapore, Malaysia, Botswana, São Tomé and Príncipe, North Macedonia, the Russian Federation, Solomon Islands, Samoa, Morocco, Albania, Sri Lanka, Hong Kong, Israel, China, Taiwan, Kuwait, Mozambique, Saudi Arabia, Isle of Man, Guatemala, Haiti, Libya, Mauritius, Costa Rica, Honduras, Angola, Namibia, Lebanon, the Philippines, and Egypt.

History 
In the 1980s, Canadian engineering company AGRA Vadeko and US chemical company US Mobil Chemical Company developed a polymer substrate trademarked as DuraNote. It had been tested by the Bank of Canada in the 1980s and 1990s; test C$ 20 and C$ 50 banknotes were auctioned in October 2012. It was also tested by the Bureau of Engraving and Printing of the United States Department of the Treasury in 1997 and 1998, when 40,000 test banknotes were printed and evaluated; and was evaluated by the central banks of 28 countries.

Security features 

Polymer banknotes usually have three levels of security devices. Primary security devices are easily recognisable by consumers and may include intaglio, metal strips, and the clear areas of the banknote. Secondary security devices are detectable by a machine.  Tertiary security devices may only be detectable by the issuing authority when a banknote is returned.

Adoption 
Modern polymer banknotes were first developed by the Reserve Bank of Australia (RBA) and the Commonwealth Scientific and Industrial Research Organisation or CSIRO and first issued as currency in Australia during 1988, to coincide with Australia's bicentennial year.

In August 2012, Nigeria's Central Bank attempted the switch back from polymer to paper banknotes, saying there were "significant difficulties associated with the processing and destruction of the polymer banknotes" which had "constrained the realisation of the benefits expected from polymer banknotes over paper notes". However, President Goodluck Jonathan halted the process in September 2012.

The polymer notes in the Republic of Mauritius are available in values of Rs 25, Rs 50, Rs 500 and Rs 2,000 rupees. The Fiji $5 was issued in April 2013.

In the United Kingdom, the first polymer banknotes were issued by the Northern Bank in Northern Ireland in 2000; these were a special commemorative issue bearing an image of the Space Shuttle. In March 2015, the Clydesdale Bank in Scotland began to issue polymer Sterling £5 notes marking the 125th anniversary of the building of the Forth Bridge. These were the first polymer notes to enter general circulation in the UK. The Royal Bank of Scotland followed in 2016 with a new issue of plastic £5 notes illustrated with a picture of author Nan Shepherd. In September 2016, the Bank of England began to issue £5 polymer notes with a picture of Winston Churchill; and in 2017 a polymer £10 began replacing its paper equivalent, featuring a picture of the author Jane Austen. A polymer £20 was issued in 2020 with a picture of J.M.W. Turner. The Bank of England has said it plans to change the final note, £50, to a polymer note. Although the new Bank of England notes will be 15% smaller than the older, paper issue, they will bear a similar design. Some businesses operating in the UK cash industry have opposed the switch to polymer, citing a lack of research into the cost impact of its introduction.

In the Philippines, it was proposed in 2009 to shift to the usage of polymer for Philippine peso banknotes. This did not push through due to concern the shift would have over the impact to country's abaca industry. The proposal was revived in 2021 during the COVID-19 pandemic since the polymer banknotes can be sanitized with less damage compared to paper banknotes, as well as other reasons such as durability, lesser average issue cost, and lesser susceptibility to counterfeiting. In April 2022, The Bangko Sentral ng Pilipinas officially released the 1000 peso bill polymer bank note into circulation.

See also

 Banknotes of the Australian dollar
 Banknotes of the Canadian dollar
 CSIRO
 Hybrid Paper Polymer Banknote
 Polymers

Notes

References

External links

 PolymerNotes.org by Stane Štraus
 Currency Note Research and Development Project from the University of Melbourne
 Professor David Solomon – Inventor of Plastic Bank Note Wins 2006 Victoria Prize from the University of Melbourne
 Polymer banknotes from Commonwealth Scientific and Industrial Research Organisation
 Note Printing Australia
 innoviasecurity.com
 PolymerNotes.de (in German) by Thomas Krause
 New Kuwaiti Dinar notes released by Kuwait News Agency.
 Costs of introducing polymer notes in the UK by CMS Payments Intelligence.

Australian inventions
Banknotes
Polymers